Chellampatti is a village of Harur taluk, Dharmapuri district, Tamil Nadu, India.

Demographics
 India census, Chellampatti village had 1,245 inhabitants, with 639 males and 606 females.

In the 2011 census, Chellampatti village had 1,713 inhabitants.

References 

Villages in Dharmapuri district